Dariga is a Kazakhstani feminine given name. Notable people with the name include:

Dariga Nazarbayeva (born 1963), Kazakh politician
Dariga Shakimova (born 1988), Kazakhstani boxer

Feminine given names
Kazakh given names